Dorothy Margaret Stuart, née Browne (1889, Meerbrook, Staffordshire – 14 September 1963) was a British poet and writer.

In 1924 she won a silver medal in the art competitions of the Olympic Games for her "Fencers' song" cycle, Sword Songs.

Her other works include literary and historical biographies, historical non-fiction particularly concentrating on the lives of women and children, and history stories for children. She was a member of the English Association from 1930 onwards, edited its News-Letter and contributed essays and book reviews to its journal, English.

Selected bibliography

Lyrics of Old London (1915)
Sword Songs (1925)
The Boy Through the Ages (1926)
The Book of Other Lands (1926)
Horace Walpole (1927)
The Girl Through the Ages (1933)
Chivalry and Social Life in the Middle Ages (1927)
Christina Rossetti (1930)
Men and Women of Plantagenet England  (1932)
The Book of Chivalry and Romance (1933)
Sir Walter Scott: Some Centenary Reflections (1934)
The King's Service (1935)
Molly Lepell: Lady Hervey (1936)
King George the Sixth (1937)
The Daughters of George III (1939)
A Child's Day Through the Ages (1941)
The Mother of Victoria: A Period Piece (1942)
The Children's Chronicle (1944)
Historic Cavalcade (1945)
The English Abigail (1946)
The Young Clavengers (1947)
The Five Wishes (1950)
Daughter of England: A New Study of Princess Charlotte of Wales and Her Family (1951)
The Story of William the Conqueror (1952)
Portrait of the Prince Regent (1953)
Dearest Bess (1955)
London Through the Ages (1956)
A Book of Cats: Legendary, Literary and Historical (1959)

Notes

External links
 Olympic Profile
 

1889 births
1963 deaths
English women poets
Olympic silver medalists in art competitions
20th-century English poets
20th-century English women writers
Medalists at the 1924 Summer Olympics
Olympic competitors in art competitions